R-enzyme may refer to one of two enzymes:
Pullulanase
Limit dextrinase